The 1950 United States Senate elections in Arizona took place on November 7, 1950. Incumbent Democratic U.S. Senator Carl Hayden ran for reelection to a fifth term, defeating Republican nominee Bruce Brockett in the general election. Brockett was formerly the Republican nominee for governor in both 1946 and 1948.

Democratic primary

Candidates
 Carl T. Hayden, incumbent U.S. Senator
 Cecil H. Miller, Arizona Farm Bureau
 Robert E. Miller, candidate for U.S. Senate in 1938, 1940

Results

Republican primary

Candidates
 Bruce Brockett, Republican nominee for governor in 1946, 1948

General election

See also 
 United States Senate elections, 1950

References

1950
Arizona
United States Senate